Mohammad Amin El Mahdi (born November 23, 1936) is the Chief Justice of the Egyptian Council of State, and one of the international judges who served at the International Criminal Tribunal for the former Yugoslavia.

References

External links

ICT transcript, 4 April 2003

1936 births
Living people
International Criminal Tribunal for the former Yugoslavia judges
20th-century Egyptian judges
Chief justices
Egyptian judges of United Nations courts and tribunals
21st-century Egyptian judges